Chirchiri is an abandoned village in the Tavush Province of Armenia.

See also
 Tavush Province

References 

Former populated places in Tavush Province